Sensational spelling is the deliberate spelling of a word in a non-standard way for special effect.

Branding
Sensational spellings are common in advertising and product placement.  In particular, brand names such as Krispy Kreme Doughnuts (crispy cream), Weetabix (wheat, with bix being derived from biscuits), Blu-ray (blue), Kellogg's "Froot Loops" (fruit) or Hasbro's Playskool (school) may use unexpected spellings to draw attention to or trademark an otherwise common word.  In video games, well-known examples of sensational spelling include "Mortal Kombat (combat) and Nintendo's "Pak" (pack), the name used for the media and accessories of its early video game systems.

In popular music
Sensational spelling may take on a cult value in popular culture, such as the heavy metal umlaut.

During the 1960s, bands often included in their names misspelled words and/or homophones that played on double meanings of the names as spoken. Examples include the Beatles, an intentional misspelling of "beetles", the Byrds, and Led Zeppelin, in which "led" was deliberately misspelled to make clear it is pronounced  (as in the metal lead) rather than the other pronunciation of "lead", . Whereas The Beatles were named largely as a pun for their beat-driven style, many of the bands who adopted the motif following their success in the mid-1960s did so in an effort (by either themselves or their record labels) to capitalize on a fad. The Turtles successfully resisted an effort by their label, White Whale Records, to name them "The Tyrtles."

In contemporary music, the misspelling of words in album or song titles rose to popularity in early 1970s rock, such as: 
 The Kinks' The Kink Kontroversy and The Kink Kronikles
 Sly and the Family Stone's "Thank You (Falettinme Be Mice Elf Agin)" (1970) (for "for letting me be myself again")
 The band Slade (e.g., "Coz I Luv You" [1971], "Mama Weer All Crazee Now" [1972])

In the 1980s it became common with funk artists such as Prince (e.g. "U Got The Look", "I Would Die 4 U"), and came to be epitomized in the rap and hip hop genres, with both song titles (e.g. Usher's "U Remind Me" and T-Pain's "Buy U A Drank") and artists' names (e.g. Ludacris, Phanatik, Timbaland, Xzibit, Gorillaz) using the form. Sensational spelling was common amongst nu metal bands of the late 1990s and early 2000s (e.g., Korn, Linkin Park and Limp Bizkit). The term "nu metal" itself is a sensational spelling of "new metal", and sometimes even stylized as "nü-metal", with an additional metal umlaut.

An influential hard-rock magazine of the 1970s–80s was Creem.

On the Internet
Many popular websites have grown from intentionally misspelling their name such as Flickr, Reddit, Tumblr, Imgur, Digg, Google and Scribd. Google's was largely an unintentional error, as its founders had intended to call it Googol after the extremely large number. In many such cases, the unorthodox spelling is done for trademark purposes, search engine optimization and/or to make it easier to secure a domain name.

Other
Terry Pratchett's fifth Discworld novel, published in 1988, is titled Sourcery. A sourcerer, in Pratchett's fictional world, is "a wizard squared; while the eighth son of a non-wizard is a wizard, the eighth son of a wizard is a sourcerer. A source of magic."

Quentin Tarantino's film Inglourious Basterds is an intentional misspelling of "Inglorious Bastards".

Aleister Crowley called his system of ceremonial magic "magick" to differentiate it from stage magic.

In modern fantasy, the spelling faerie (also fae or fey) may be used in place of fairy, to distinguish it from the childish connotations of fairy tales.

See also
 Cacography
 Catachresis
 Eye dialect
 Lolcat
 
 Satirical misspelling
 Spelling reform
 Typographical error
 Typosquatting

References

Nonstandard spelling
Brands